Srinivasan Ramachandran is an Indian biologist, bioinformatician and a senior principal scientist at the department of genome analysis of the Institute of Genomics and Integrative Biology. Known for his studies in the field of data analytics, Ramachandran is also an adjunct faculty, senior Principal Scientist and AcSIR Professor at the Faculty of Biological Sciences of the Indian Institute of Technology, Delhi. The Department of Biotechnology of the Government of India awarded him the National Bioscience Award for Career Development, one of the highest Indian science awards, for his contributions to biosciences in 2007.

Biography 

S. Ramachandran did his undergraduate studies at the St. Xavier’s College, Kolkata and after earning a BSc (honors) degree from the University of Calcutta, he completed post graduate studies at Jawaharlal Nehru University (JNU) in biotechnology. Continuing at JNU, he secured a PhD in 1993 and started his career by joining the Institute of Genomics and Integrative Biology (IGIB) where he serves as a senior principal scientist at the department of genome analysis. He also serves as an adjunct faculty and principal scientist at the faculty of biological sciences of the University of Calcutta, holding the position of a professor of Academy of Scientific and Innovative Research (AcSIR).

Ramachandran's research is in the field of informative bioinformatics and he leads a group of scientists engaged in integrative immunoinformatics, architecture of gene co-expression and flux modeling. He is credited with the discovery of new virulence factors in Mycobacterium tuberculosis, which was accomplished using computational analysis; the studies were subsequently verified through experiments. He is the co-developer of SPAAN, a genome informatics software and has contributed to the development of OSDDlinux, a customized computer operating system for drug discovery. His studies have been documented by way of a number of articles and ResearchGate, an online repository of scientific articles has listed 115 of them. Besides he has delivered keynote or invited speeches at various seminars and conferences.

The Department of Biotechnology of the Government of India awarded him the National Bioscience Award for Career Development, one of the highest Indian science awards in 2007.

Selected bibliography

See also 

 Shotgun metagenomics
 Metabolic network modelling

Notes

References

External links 
 
 

N-BIOS Prize recipients
Indian scientific authors
Living people
Academic staff of the University of Calcutta
Year of birth missing (living people)
University of Calcutta alumni
Jawaharlal Nehru University alumni
Scientists from Delhi
St. Xavier's College, Kolkata alumni
Indian bioinformaticians
Academic staff of IIT Delhi